The 390th Electronic Combat Squadron (390 ECS) is a United States Air Force unit. It is assigned to the 366th Fighter Wing at Mountain Home Air Force Base, Idaho and stationed at Naval Air Station Whidbey Island, Washington.

The 390th was constituted on 24 May 1943 as the 390th Fighter Squadron and assigned to the 366 Fighter Group. On 17 December 1943 the unit was moved to Membury England and began combat operations in the European Theater. Since this time the unit has flown over ten different aircraft including the F-51, F-86, F-4, F-111 and the F-15. In the late 90s the USAF retired its aging fleet of EF-111A's leaving the Air Force without a dedicated EA platform. While the Air Force's EA platform may have disappeared the need for electronic attack has not. Due to this fact, in 1995, the Office of the Secretary of Defense arranged an agreement with the Navy embedding USAF electronic warfare airmen in Navy EA-6B and now EA-18G squadrons. Currently, The 390th provides logistical expertise and personnel to operate the EA-18G Growler in support of the Joint Airborne Electronic Attack Program.

Mission
390 ECS's mission is to man and deploy the Expeditionary EA-18G Growler squadrons in accordance with the Joint Airborne Electronic Attack program.

History

World War II
The 390th flew combat missions in the European Theater of Operations from 14 March 1944 – 3 May 1945.

Vietnam

The 390th flew combat missions in Southeast Asia from, c. 18 November 1965 – 14 June 1972.

Electronic Warfare

The squadron conducted replacement training from, 1 July 1974 – c. 18 August 1976. It trained EF-111A Raven aircrews in electronic countermeasures from, 15 December 1982 – 4 August 1992. The 390th again saw combat when it jammed radar sites during the invasion of Panama in December 1989, and the Gulf War from, 17 January 1991 – 6 March 1991. The 390 FS also deployed aircraft and aircrews to Turkey and Saudi Arabia from, 10 January–c. 11 September 1992.

It was redesignated the 390th Electronic Combat Squadron again on 27 September 2010. The squadron was located at Naval Air Station Whidbey Island, Washington and flew EA-6B Prowlers alongside VAQ-129. The last flight of the unit in the Prowler took place on 9 July 2014 as the squadron transitioned to the EA-18G Growler.

Operations
World War II
Vietnam War
Operation Just Cause
Operation Desert Storm

Lineage
 Constituted as the 390th Fighter Squadron (Single Engine) on 24 May 1943
 Activated on 1 June 1943
 Redesignated 390th Fighter Squadron, Single Engine on 20 August 1943
 Inactivated on 20 August 1945
 Redesignated 390th Fighter-Bomber Squadron on 15 November 1952
 Activated 1 January 1953
 Redesignated 390th Tactical Fighter Squadron on 1 July 1958
 Inactivated on 1 April 1959
 Activated on 30 April 1962 (not organized)
 Organized on 8 May 1962
 Inactivated on 1 October 1982
 Redesignated 390th Electronic Combat Squadron on 10 December 1982
 Activated on 15 December 1982
 Redesignated 390th Fighter Squadron on 11 September 1992
 Redesignated 390th Electronic Combat Squadron on 27 September 2010

Assignments

 366th Fighter Group: 1 June 1943 – 20 August 1946
 366th Fighter-Bomber Group: 1 January 1953 (attached to 21st Fighter-Bomber Wing 25 December 1955 – c. 14 June 1956)
 366th Fighter-Bomber Wing (later 366th Tactical Fighter Wing): 25 September 1957 – 1 April 1959
 United States Air Forces in Europe: 30 April 1962 (not organized)
 366th Tactical Fighter Wing: 8 May 1962
 6252d Tactical Fighter Wing: 29 October 1965

35th Tactical Fighter Wing: 8 April 1966
 366th Tactical Fighter Wing: 10 October 1966
 347th Tactical Fighter Wing: 30 June 1972
 366th Tactical Fighter Wing (later 366th Fighter Wing: 31 October 1972 – 1 October 1982 (attached Detachment 1, Hq, 366th Tactical Fighter Wing 19 August 1976 – 16 September 1976)
 366th Fighter Wing: 15 December 1982 – present)

Stations

 Richmond Army Air Base, Virginia, 1 June 1943
 Bluethenthal Field, North Carolina, 9 August 1943
 Richmond Army Air Base, Virginia, 6 November 1943 – 17 December 1943
RAF Membury, England, 10 January 1944
RAF Thruxton, England, 1 March 1944
Saint-Pierre-du-Mont Airfield, France, 20 June 1944
Dreux - Vernouillet Airport, France, 25 August 1944
Laon-Couvron Air Base, France, 8 September 1944
Asch Airfield, Belgium, 26 November 1944
Münster-Handorf Airfield, Germany, 14 April 1945
Bayreuth-Bindlach Airfield, Germany, 28 June 1945

Fritzlar Air Base, Germany, 14 September 1945 – 20 August 1946
 England Air Force Base, Louisiana, 1 January 1953 – 1 April 1959
 Deployed to Aviano Air Base, Italy, 25 December 1955 – c. 14 June 1956
Chambley-Bussieres Air Base, France, 30 April 1962
Holloman Air Force Base, New Mexico, 12 June 1963
Da Nang Air Base, South Vietnam, 29 October 1965 (deployed to Clark Air Base, Philippines until c. 17 November 1965)
 Mountain Home Air Force Base, Idaho, 30 June 1972 – 1 October 1982
 Mountain Home Air Force Base, Idaho, 15 December 1982
Deployed to Taegu Air Base, South Korea 19 August – 16 September 1976, NAS Keflavik, Iceland 19 January 2006 – 20 April 2006
 Naval Air Station Whidbey Island, Washington, 27 September 2010 – present

Aircraft
P-47 Thunderbolt (1943–1946)
P-51 Mustang (1953)
F-86 Sabre (1953–1955)
F-84 Thunderjet (1954–1958, 1962–1965)
F-100 Super Sabre (1957–1959)
F-4 Phantom II (1965–1972)
F-111F model then F-111A model Aardvark (1972–1982)
EF-111A Raven (1982–1992)
F-15C/D Eagle (1992–2010)
EA-6B Prowler (2010–2014)
EA-18G Growler (2011–present)

Campaign streamers

World War II: 
Air Offensive, Europe
Normandy
Northern France
Rhineland
Ardennes-Alsace
Central Europe
Air Combat, EAME Theater

Vietnam: 
Vietnam Defensive 
Vietnam Air 
Vietnam Air Offensive
Vietnam Air Offensive, Phase II
Vietnam Air Offensive, Phase III
Vietnam Air/Ground
Vietnam Air Offensive, Phase IV 
TET 69/Counteroffensive
Vietnam Summer-Fall, 1969
Vietnam Winter-Spring, 1970
Sanctuary Counteroffensive
Southwest Monsoon
Commando Hunt V
Commando Hunt VI
Commando Hunt VII
Vietnam Ceasefire

Southwest Asia: 
Defense of Saudi Arabia
Liberation and Defense of Kuwait
Ceasefire

Armed Forces Expeditionary Streamers:
Panama, 1989–1990.

Decorations 

 
Distinguished Unit Citation: 
 Normandy, 11 July 1944

Presidential Unit Citations (Southeast Asia): 
 23 Apr–1 Aug 1967
 1 Apr–26 Jun 1972

Air Force Outstanding Unit Awards with Combat "V" Device: 
 1 May 1966 – 31 Mar 1967
 1 Apr 1967 – 31 Mar 1968
 1 Apr 1968 – 31 Jul 1969
 1 Aug 1969 – 1 Aug 1970 
 2 Aug 1970 – 31 Mar 1972
 
Meritorious Unit Award: 
 1 Jan 2007 – 31 May 2008. 

Air Force Outstanding Unit Awards: 
 1 May 1964 – 30 Apr 1966; 
 17 Apr 1974 – 15 Apr 1976; 
 16 Apr 1976 – 27 Mar 1978; 
 18 Aug–16 Sep 1976; 
 1 Apr 1983 – 31 Mar 1985; 
 1 Mar 1989 – 28 Feb 1991; 
 1 Mar 1992 – 28 Feb 1994; 
 1 Jun 1996 – 31 May 1998; 
 1 Jun 1999 – 31 May 2001; 
 1 Jun 2001 – 31 May 2002; 
 1 Jun 2003 – 31 May 2005; 
 1 Jun 2005 – 31 May 2006; 
 1 Jun 2011 – 31 May 2012.

Cited in the Orders of the Day, Belgian Army: 
 6 Jun–30 Sep 1944; 
 1 Oct–17 Dec 1944; 
 18 Dec 1944 – 25 Jan 1945. 
Belgian Fourragere. 
Republic of Vietnam Gallantry Cross with Palm: 
 1 May 1966 – 30 Jun 1972.

Previous commanders

 Capt Harold N. Holt, 1 June 1943 
 Capt Clure E. Smith, 14 May 1944 
 Capt Maurice L. Martin, 2 October 1944 
 Capt Lowell B. Smith, 1 Feb – c. 20 Apr 1945 
 unknown, 21 Apr 1945 – 20 Aug 1946 
 Maj John W. Saxton, c. 1 Jan 1953-unknown
 Lt Col Harold E. Comstock, c. Jun 1954-unknown
 Maj Joseph S. Michalowski, unknown – 14 Aug 1957 
 Maj Fred H. Henderson, 14 August 1957 
 Lt Col Frank J. McGuinness, 9 Sep 1958 – 1 Apr 1959 
 unknown, 8 May – 15 Jul 1962
 Lt Col Raymond L. Hurley, 16 July 1962 
 Lt Col Jack Bellamy, 29 June 1964 
 Lt Col Douglas H. Frost, Jul 1966 
 Lt Col Hoyt S. Vandenberg Jr., 6 January 1967
 Lt Col Hervey S. Stockman, 19 May 1967 
 Lt Col Clement D. Billingslea, 11 June 1967 
 Lt Col Fred A. Haeffner, 20 June 1967 
 Lt Col Wayne T. Elder, 23 November 1967
 Lt Col John S. Stoer, 19 May 1968
 Lt Col Cecil G. Foster, 29 July 1968 
 Lt Col Robert S. McCormick, 7 June 1969 
 Lt Col Garold R. Beck, 19 June 1969
 Lt Col John E. Cadou, 27 March 1970

 Lt Col Robert B. Watson, 8 December 1970
 Lt Col Delbert H. Jacobs, 22 April 1971 
 Lt Col Walter E. Bjorneby, 18 December 1971 
 Lt Col Gene E. Taft, 6 May-c. 14 June 1972 
 none (not manned), 15–29 Jun 1972
 Lt Col Robert B. Coburn, 30 June 1972
 Lt Col Ronald G. Strack, 18 June 1973 
 Lt Col David H. Reiner, 13 December 1974 
 Lt Col John A. Dramesi, 1 May 1975
 Lt Col James C. Sharp, 12 April 1976
 Lt Col Brian R. Williams, 16 May 1977 
 Lt Col Joe G. Cabuk Jr., 10 May 1979 
 Lt Col Samuel L. Harris, 9 Jan 1981 – 1 Oct 1982 
 Lt Col Herbert T. Pickering Jr., 15 December 1982
 Lt Col Robert J. Osterloh, 24 June 1983
 Lt Col William R. Teske, 7 June 1985
 Lt Col Richard M. Meeboer, 22 June 1987
 Lt Col Dennis Hardziej, 1 June 1989
 Lt Col Kenneth J. Muldowney, 7 June 1991
 Lt Col Larry D. New, 17 June 1992
 Lt Col Peter J. Bunce, 24 March 1994
 Lt Col Frank Gorenc, 22 January 1996
 Lt Col Mitch R. Fryt, 25 July 1997
 Lt Col Eric M. O’Connell, 16 July 1999

 Lt Col James P. Molloy, 9 March 2001
 Lt Col David A. Slade, 7 March 2003
 Lt Col Jeffrey W. Prichard, 25 March 2005
 Lt Col David L. Cool, 20 November 2006
 Lt Col James E. Stratton, 25 October 2008
 Lt Col Donald K. McFatridge, 27 September 2010
 Lt Col Karl Fischbach, May 2011
 Lt Col Don Keen, May 2013
 Lt Col Allen A. Geist, 20 May 2015
 Lt Col Jeffery S. Kassebaum, May 2017
 Lt Col David C. Davidson, June 2021

References

Notes

Bibliography

External links
366th Operations Group Fact Sheet
Naval Air Station Whidbey Island Web Page – 390th Electronic Combat Squadron

Military units and formations established in 1943
Military units and formations in Idaho
Electronic combat squadrons of the United States Air Force